Conry may refer to:

People
Joseph A. Conry (1868–1943), US politician
Kieran Conry (born 1951), former Bishop of Arundel and Brighton, England
Michael F. Conry (1870–1970), US politician
Susan Conry, American engineering educator

Places
Republic of Ireland
Conry (civil parish), a civil parish in the barony of Rathconrath, County Westmeath

See also
Fláithrí Ó Maol Chonaire (also known as Florence Conry, Conroy, O'Mulconry; 1560–1629), Irish Franciscan and theologian